Pongo en tus manos abiertas ("I Put Into Your Open Hands") is the fourth studio album by Chilean singer-songwriter Víctor Jara, released in June 1969. It was the third album released by the Jota Jota record label (later known as DICAP), established by the Communist Youth to release Nueva canción chilena artist recordings such as Quilapayún, who also collaborated in the musical accompaniment of some tracks.

For this album, Jara composed and sang more politicized songs than his predecessors, with some like "A Luis Emilio Recabarren" in which he praises the founder of the Communist Party of Chile or "Preguntas por Puerto Montt" in which he condemns the massacre perpetrated in that city and the interior minister Edmundo Pérez Zujovic. It has been the most praised album of his career, being considered the fifth best Chilean album by Rolling Stone magazine.

Background 
In 1968, Jara spent more than half a year touring the United States and England, "countries where social agitation was lived to the rhythm of the most classic era of rock." In New York, he offered a recital on a hispanic television channel and in California, Jara visited the campus of the University of Berkley very close to San Francisco and University of California, Los Angeles (UCLA). During his performances he used a projector that allowed the audience to see the lyrics of his songs in English, and offered his "Marxist vision" of Latin American reality. 

In England, he was invited by the British Council to carry out activities related to theater directing. During his work in English theater productions. His 3 year old daughter Amanda fell ill and was taken to a hospital. After finding out, Jara began to send letters to his wife Joan Jara to find out the state of her daughter's health, but the post office officials in England were on strike, which made it almost impossible to know more about the news. He sat on his hotel bed, and with an "overflowing feeling of loneliness" he composed the song "Te Recuerdo Amanda".

According to the University of Santiago, Chile, the names of the characters mentioned in "Te Recuerdo Amanda", Manuel and Amanda are taken from their parents and daughter. However, Joan pointed out that he "did not specifically dedicate it to either of them, although it contains the mother's smile and her daughter's promise of youth." Jara in his concert held in Peru on July 17, 1973 commented that the song "speaks of the love of two workers, of any factory, anywhere, of what exists within the soul."

Recording 
Pongo en tus manos abiertas was recorded when Victor Jara returned from his works in theatrical productions in England, it contains a much more direct political proposal than that of his predecessors, which he was able to carry out without problems on the then Jota Jota label (later known as Discoteca del Cantar Popular "DICAP"). It was created by the Cultural Commission of the Communist Youth and Vicente Larrea to grant production and dissemination spaces to groups and soloists of the then Nueva canción chilena. Among the first works done on that label is X Vietnam by Chilean group Quilapayun (1968). The success of this album led to the Communist Youth deciding to follow "a particular use and projection of the industry."

In the album, Victor had the musical accompaniment of Quilapayun, on some tracks, the group offers from a quena to two guitars and also make more meaningful collaborations. In ""Móvil" Oil Special", embody the students who star in the song and contribute to its Son Cubano rhythm. It also used the sound of the protesters, their chants and the explosion of the gas grenades perpetuated by "fearsome special squads" of the Chilean police called Móvil Group (Spanish: Grupo Movil). The United States, in support of anticommunism in Chile, sent them weapons and riot gear. "A Cochabamba me voy" includes Quilapayun choirs that mark the guaracha rhythm, and is "Victor Jara's greeting to the guerrillas in Bolivia."

Composition 

In this album, Jara maintains his average of five own songs per album; "A Luis Emilio Recabarren" is one of them and is dedicated to the founder of the Communist Party of Chile, Luis Emilio Recabarren. Jara is mostly dedicated to cover songs by other composers of the same folkloric or protest style, of the Uruguayan composer Daniel Viglietti were "A Desalambrar" and "Camilo Torres". The first is in milonga rhythm and "criticizes the occupation and ownership of land by wealthy landowners and foreign corporations who exploit the labor of poor peasants and leave toxic waste in mineral exploration". The last is a tribute song to the Colombian priest of the same name. Jara also versioned the Latin American lullaby, "Duerme Negrito" collected by Atahualpa Yupanqui and "Juan Sin Tierra", a tribute song to the Mexican revolutionary Emiliano Zapata written by Jorge Saldaña.  

"Preguntas por Puerto Montt" is a song that condemns the Puerto Montt massacre perpetuated in March 9, 1969 in which they died 11 men, women, and children. In the song he also directly accuses the then Christian Democrat interior minister, Edmundo Pérez Zujovic for having ordered the massacre, sending the Móvil Group to the outskirts of the city of Puerto Montt with the aim of burning the makeshift shacks and firing machine guns at the peasant families who were protesting the rural living conditions, killing eight peasants who were running disorganized. Four days later, Jara took the stage during a massive protest in Santiago and premiered his "most angry song to date".

After Móvil Group stormed with water cannons and tear gas against students demonstrating for university reforms. Jara with Quilapayun wrote ""Móvil" Oil Special", a song with a play on words with the American oil company Mobil and Móvil Group. The phrase "mata tire tirun din" is a play on words with the nursery rhyme "mandan dirun dirun dan". Jara also covered songs by American, Mexican and Chilean composers: "If I Had a Hammer" written by Lee Hays and Pete Seeger was retitled "El Martillo", "Zamba del "Che"" is a tribute song to the Argentine guerrilla Che Guevara composed in 1967 by Rubén Ortiz Fernández, and "Ya Parte el Galgo Terrible" was composed in that year by Sergio Ortega for Pablo Neruda's play, Fulgor y muerte de Joaquin Murieta.

"Te Recuerdo Amanda" initially appeared as the b-side of the "Plegaria a un labrador" single (included in the 1971 album, El derecho de vivir en paz), and later was included in the album, becoming "a hymn to love and the workers struggle". The song has been covered by several artists including Fito Páez, Joaquín Sabina, Joan Baez, Silvio Rodríguez, Joan Manuel Serrat, Presuntos Implicados and Boom Boom Kid.

Artwork 
The album cover shows the "working hands" of Victor Jara, it was photographed by Mario Guillard and designed by Vicente and Antonio Larrea, the latter worked as a photographer and studied Applied Arts.

Release 
Pongo en tus manos abietas was released in June 1969 in Santiago on the Jota Jota label. Some editions released in Peru, Germany and Italy were titled Te recuerdo Amanda. The original editions were in monaural sound, later reissues were in stereo sound. In March 2001 it was reissued by Warner Records with the addition of six bonus tracks. In 2017, the album was reissued in vinyl format along with others by Jara such as Victor Jara (1966), El derecho de vivir en paz (1971), La Población (1972) and Manifiesto (1974).

Critical reception 

In retrospective reviews, Pongo en tus manos abiertas was highly praised. In Review Online, Paul Attard wrote that can be felt a "level of unity brimming on Jara's fourth studio album". He also felt that "Jara's signature, syrupy delivery wended through South American folkways" and he concluded by saying that "his songwriting would go on to inform folk-protest music more generally. However, what's most striking about his work are its parallels to this form, as it evolved across continents, with its stunning humanism never lost in translation."

Wilson Neate wrote in AllMusic, that the album "was his masterpiece" and "a landmark in the evolution of the nueva canción". He continued stating that "Jara's music blended indigenous instrumentation and folk forms with a contemporary singer/songwriter orientation" and that "his lyrical focus on land reform, organized labor, poverty, imperialism, and race specifically addressed Chile under Frei's presidency but also engaged with a Pan-American revolutionary consciousness and a global progressive awareness."

In a review of the 1974 edition, under the name Te Recuerdo Amanda, John Bush of AllMusic commented that "Jara's readings are so emotional, no knowledge of Spanish is necessary to understand his songs. There is some superficial distorsion to the material -- the result of a direct-form-phonograph transfer -- but the music is timeless." In 2008, the magazine Rolling Stone considered it the fifth best Chilean album of all time.

Track listing
Side A

Side B

2001's extended version
Re-release from March, 2001 by Warner Records

References

Bibliography

External links
 
Víctor Jara Foundation site (Spanish language)

1969 albums
Víctor Jara albums
Albums produced by Víctor Jara
Spanish-language albums
Warner Records albums
Nueva canción albums